Press for Change (PFC) is a UK-based campaign group focusing on the rights and treatment of trans people. Its stated aim is "seeking respect and equality for all trans people in the UK". The group led the campaign for full legal recognition for transgender people living in Britain including the right to marry.  
The organisation began on 27 February 1992 and its founders included Mark Rees and Stephen Whittle.

Notable figures in the group
Christine Burns MBE, former vice president.
Angela Clayton MBE, former vice president.
Claire McNab MBE, former vice president.
Mark Rees, co founder of the group (no longer actively involved).
 Professor Stephen Whittle, OBE, PhD vice president and co founder of the group.

Burns and Whittle were given their honours, "for services to gender issues," in relation to their work for Press for Change.

Patrons
Julie Hesmondhalgh, the actress who plays Hayley Cropper in Coronation Street, the first transgender character in a British soap opera.

See also
 Transgender rights in the United Kingdom

References

External links
 Press for Change

Webarchive link to old version of Press for Change including extensive document archive

Transgender organisations in the United Kingdom
Transgender rights
1992 establishments in the United Kingdom
Organizations established in 1992